Boos is an unincorporated community in Jasper County, Illinois, United States. Boos is located on Illinois Route 130, southeast of Newton. The community once had a grocery store and a station on the Illinois Central Railroad.

References

Unincorporated communities in Jasper County, Illinois
Unincorporated communities in Illinois